Clarence Jones may refer to:

Clarence Jones (American football) (born 1968), American football player
Clarence Jones (baseball) (born 1940), Major League Baseball player
Clarence Jones (missionary) (1900–1986), American missionary in Ecuador and by radio
Clarence Jones (musician) (1889–1949), pianist and composer
Clarence B. Jones (born 1931), lawyer and advisor to Martin Luther King
A. Clarence Jones, college football player
Clarence "Jeep" Jones (1933–2020), American community activist
Bill Jones (basketball, born 1966) (Clarence William Jones), American basketball player
Jimmy Jones (tennis) (Clarence Medlycott Jones, 1912–1986), British tennis player and author